Coşkun Özarı (January 4, 1931 – June 22, 2011) was a Turkish football player and coach.

Born 1931 in Istanbul, Coşkun Özarı joined Galatasaray as a very young student. After graduating from Galatasaray Lycee, he first appeared in the Galatasaray starting line-up at the age of 17. The backbone of Galatasaray, as well as the national team defense for the next 13 years, Özarı was known for his hard tackling, but mild manners.

His leadership in defense led the team with Gündüz Kılıç as coach, Turgay Şeren in goal and Metin Oktay upfront, to several championships and Turkish Cup victories.

Özarı's career as a player ended early due to his desire to become a coach. In 1961, he attended a coaching seminar in England, led by Walter Winterbottom. When he returned home, he became Galatasaray's assistant coach. Three years later, he took over the head coach position from Kılıç and led the team to four championships.

When he was appointed national team coach, in 1965, he coached the team for 10 years. He managed the team from 1972 to 1976. He ended his coaching career in 1986 and became a sportswriter.

Death
Coşkun Özarı died on June 22, 2011 at a hospital in Istanbul. Following the religious funeral service held at Teşvikiye Mosque, attended by officials of major football clubs, his body was laid to rest at the Zincirlikuyu Cemetery.

See also
List of one-club men

References

1931 births
2011 deaths
Turkish footballers
Turkey international footballers
Galatasaray S.K. footballers
Galatasaray S.K. (football) managers
Turkish football managers
Süper Lig players
Süper Lig managers
Galatasaray High School alumni
Sportswriters
Turkey national football team managers
Burials at Zincirlikuyu Cemetery
Adana Demirspor managers
Association football defenders